The aryepiglottic folds are triangular folds of mucous membrane of the larynx. They enclose ligamentous and muscular fibres. They extend from the lateral borders of the epiglottis to the arytenoid cartilages, hence the name 'aryepiglottic'. They contain the aryepiglottic muscles and form the upper borders of the quadrangular membrane. They have a role in growling as a form of phonation. They may be narrowed and cause stridor, or be shortened and cause laryngomalacia.

Structure 
The aryepiglottic folds are triangular. They are narrow in front, wide behind, and slope obliquely downward and backward. They originate from the lateral borders of the epiglottis. They insert into the arytenoid cartilages.

In front, they are bounded by the epiglottis. Behind, they are bounded by the apices of the arytenoid cartilages, the corniculate cartilages, and the interarytenoid notch. Within the posterior part of each aryepiglottic fold exists a cuneiform cartilage which forms whitish prominence, the cuneiform tubercle.

The aryepiglottic folds contain the aryepiglottic muscles. They form the upper borders of the quadrangular membrane, and the lateral borders of the laryngeal inlet.

Function

Phonation 
Under certain circumstances, the aryepiglottic folds take part in phonation, for instance in the singing technique of vocal growl, such as practiced by Louis Armstrong and other jazz singers. The approximation of the aryepiglottic folds during vocalization may establish sustained co-oscillations, at relatively low frequencies, producing the growl or growling effect.

Clinical significance

Stridor 
If the aryepiglottic folds narrow the laryngeal inlet, they may cause stridor.

Laryngomalacia 
The aryepiglottic folds are shortened in laryngomalacia. They may be surgically removed to prevent problems eating and shortness of breath.

Gallery

References

Bibliography 

 Hals-Nasen-Ohren-Heilkunde, 12. Auflage, 2005, S.239–45.  
 Schuhmacher GH, Aumüller G, Topographische Anatomie des Menschen, Elsevier, 2004,

External links 
 
 
 

Human throat